Phyllonorycter nevadensis is a moth of the family Gracillariidae. It is found in Spain.

The larvae feed on Adenocarpus decorticans. They mine the leaves of their host plant. They create a lower-surface tentiform mine. Pupation takes place within the mine.

References

nevadensis
Moths of Europe
Moths described in 1908